Richard Michael Schulze (born January 1941) is an American billionaire businessman. He is the founder of Best Buy and was chairman and CEO. On the Forbes 2016 list of the world's billionaires, he was ranked number 722 with a net worth of US$2.4 billion.

Early life and education
Richard M. Schulze was born and raised in Saint Paul, Minnesota, where he attended Central High School. He subsequently spent time in the U.S. Air Force with the Minnesota Air National Guard. After the Air Force, he worked as a consumer electronics salesman.

He has an honorary degree from the University of St. Thomas in Saint Paul.

Career
In 1966, mortgaging his home, he founded an audio equipment store named Sound of Music in Saint Paul. The company expanded to nine stores, and after a tornado destroyed one, he had a "tornado sale" at one location with a very large selection of goods and low prices. The sale was a hit, and he renamed the chain Best Buy and shifted the model to a superstore format with 18,000-sq-ft stores, everyday low prices, and a heavy advertising budget. The format was very popular and thanks to increased demand for consumer electronics (especially with the advent of VCRs), the chain grew to 40 stores in 1989. Thereafter, he eliminated the commission model (customers disliked aggressive sales) and expanded Best Buy's offerings to include computer software, music, movies, and computer hardware. In 1994, he increased the average store size to between 45,000 and 58,000 sq ft. In 1995, the chain had $5 billion in sales and 155 stores. In 1996, Best Buy added appliances and kitchen utensils to its lineup.

In May 2012, Schulze announced that he was stepping down as Best Buy chairman after an investigation found that he knew that the CEO was having a relationship with a female employee and did not alert the audit committee.

As announced on August 6, 2012, Schulze made a bid to buy out the Best Buy company. According to the report, he already owned 20% of the company. This news caused the share price of Best Buy to go up slightly. By late February, talks between Best Buy Co. and Schulze ended. Private equity investors and he sought three board seats in exchange for acquiring a minority stake in the company, but he was not able to line up the funding.

On March 25, 2013, Best Buy Co. Inc. announced that Schulze would rejoin the company that he founded with a new title: chairman emeritus. The Richfield, Minnesota-based retailer also announced that two former executives, Brad Anderson and Al Lenzmeier, will serve as Schulze's representatives on the board of directors. They are key Schulze allies who had advised him on his attempt to buy the company.

Philanthropy
In 2000, Schulze donated $50 million to the University of St. Thomas, at the time the largest donation to a Minnesota college or university. The money went to help open the UST School of Law, featuring the prominent Schulze Grand Atrium, as well as the Schulze School of Entrepreneurship, part of the St. Thomas College of Business and located in Schulze Hall ; both schools are in downtown Minneapolis. Schulze sits on the Board of Governors of the UST School of Law.

In 2014, after fire destroyed the Naples, FL YMCA, the Richard M. Schulze Family Foundation donated $1.5 million for restoration.  And in 2018, Schulze through his Family Foundation donated $750,000 to the Sky Family YMCA in Bonita Springs, Florida.

Personal life
Schulze lives in Naples, Florida. He is a Catholic and was married to Sandra J. Schulze until her death in 2001, with whom he had four children. He is remarried to Maureen Schulze. On November 9, 1991, Minnesota Governor Arne Carlson designated the day as Richard M. Schulze Day.

References

External links
 Forbes 400
 Best Buy News Center: Biography: Richard Schulze

1941 births
Living people
American billionaires
American philanthropists
American chief executives
American people of German descent
Businesspeople from Saint Paul, Minnesota
Best Buy people
People from Bonita Springs, Florida
Catholics from Florida